Club Basket Burgos 2002, also known by sponsorship reasons as Grupo de Automoción Santiago, was a basketball team based in Burgos, Castile and Lion, Spain, who currently plays in Liga EBA.

History

Basket Burgos 2002 was founded in that year with the aim of playing in the Provincial League of Burgos, that works independently of the Spanish league system.

On 2010, after being relegated CD Juventud del Círculo from Liga EBA to 1ª División, some players and the coach of the team decided to create a Primera División team of Basket Burgos 2002. On 2010-11 season, the team finished as runner-up of the Castile and Lion group, and promotes to Liga EBA after winning the final stage celebrated in Burgos.

In their first season, Basket Burgos was relegated but remained in the league by achieving a vacant place.

In 2017, the club agreed collaboration terms with CB Miraflores, main club of the city, and started acting as its farm team.

In 2018, Basket Burgos 2002 was completely integrated in CB Miraflores and dissolved as independent club.

Head coaches
Miguel Ángel Segura 2010–2015
Evaristo Pérez 2015–2018

Season by season

Notable players
 Jules Dang Akodo

References

External links
Official website

Sport in Burgos
Basketball teams in Castile and León
Former Liga EBA teams
CB Miraflores
Basketball teams established in 2002
Basketball teams disestablished in 2018